The Norway men's national field hockey team represents Norway in men's international field hockey competitions and is controlled by the field hockey section of Norway's Bandy Association, the governing body for field hockey in Norway.

The team competes in the EuroHockey Championship IV, the fourth level of the men's European field hockey championships.

Tournament record

EuroHockey Championship IV
2015 – 8th place
2019 – 
2021 – Withdrew

References

European men's national field hockey teams
National team
Field hockey